Olle Palmer  (born 4 October 1955) is a former Swedish tennis player.

Career
As a Junior, Palmer participated in the Boys' Singles event at the 1973 Wimbledon Championships and lost in the second round.

Palmer made his debut in the main draw of a Grand Prix tournament at the 1973 Stockholm Open, beating his compatriot Terje Larsen in the first round and losing in the second round to the tournament second seed, Ilie Năstase.

Palmer did not play in the singles main draw of a Grand Slam tournament, but at the 1976 Australian Open he played with his compatriot, Ulf Eriksson in the doubles and lost in the first round. Palmer has a career high ATP singles ranking of 140 that he achieved on 26 November 1973.

References

External links 
 
 

1955 births
Living people
Swedish male tennis players
Tennis players from Stockholm
20th-century Swedish people